Richard George Mann (born 1949) is an American academic working as a professor of art at San Francisco State University. He is a specialist in the art of Spain.

Early life and education
Mann was born in 1949. He received a Bachelor of Arts degree from Kalamazoo College in 1972, a Master of Arts from the University of Minnesota in 1974, and a Ph.D. from New York University in 1982.

Career
Mann is professor of art at San Francisco State University. He is a specialist in Spanish art. In 1986, he produced El Greco and his patrons: Three major projects, the first volume in the Cambridge Studies in the History of Art, in which he investigated three of El Greco's six major projects and the patrons responsible for them.

With Jonathan Brown he prepared the volume on Spanish paintings of the fifteenth to nineteenth centuries in the National Gallery of Art in their systematic catalogue series.

Selected publications
El Greco and his patrons: Three major projects. Cambridge University Press, Cambridge, 1986. 
Spanish paintings of the fifteenth through nineteenth centuries, National Gallery of Art, Washington, 1990. (With Jonathan Brown) (Collections of the National Gallery of Art Systematic Catalogue)

References 

American art historians
Living people
Spanish art
Kalamazoo College alumni
University of Minnesota alumni
New York University alumni
1949 births